Yohan Hwang, also known as Yohan King, (born November 27, 1995) is a South Korean singer based in Manila, Philippines. He rose to fame after joining and eventually winning the first season of I Love OPM. Yohan later went on to perform a Korean-language cover of the Yeng Constantino single "Ikaw" for the Tagalog-language dub of Love in the Moonlight.

Biography

Early life and education
Yohan Hwang was born in Gyeonggi-do Goyang-si Ilsan, South Korea to South Korean parents. He has an older brother named Joseph and a younger sister. In 2014, his family moved to the Philippines, during which he continued his studies at the De La Salle College Antipolo.

Music career

2016: I Love OPM
One time at a function in La Salle, he performed Side A's "Ako'y Sayo" after his friend recommended him to perform a Filipino song. The cheers he received gave him confidence and it marked the start of his love for singing. Not long after, he joined ABS-CBN's new television format I Love OPM wherein non-Filipino and 100% foreigners competed against each other in a singing competition, performing only Filipino songs and most notably the Original Pilipino Music (OPM) genre. During the first-season auditions of the said program, which aired on February 27, 2016, Hwang performed IAXE Band's "Ako'y Sa'Yo at Ika'y Akin", popularized by Daniel Padilla. He was given all three approved marks from the Himigration officers (or judges) Toni Gonzaga, Lani Misalucha, and Martin Nievera, stating that he sounded like a true Filipino and his rendition was beautiful.

Hwang advanced to the semi-finals after consistently receiving high scores and praises from both the judges and the studio audience. Along with Harris Dio Smith, Hwang was the first finalist to advance to the finals after garnering one of the two highest votes from the studio audience. J Morning and Ryan Gallagher joined them later on after gaining the approval from the judges. Both Hwang and J Morning are South Korean finalists.

During the grand finals held at the Resorts World Manila on April 23, he performed Sugarfree's "Huwag Ka Nang Umiyak" with the Liturgikon Vocal Ensemble. It was the first time throughout the show that he showed his vocal range rather than his usual soft and sweet ballad performances. Hwang explained that he decided to sing a powerful ballad because he wanted to show and to prove to the critics that he is serious with his singing. He eventually won against the other three finalists after receiving 32.82% of the combined votes from the judges and the public. He was proclaimed the winner at the end of the competition, winning 2 million pesos, a one-year recording contract from Star Music, and vacation package to Cebu. His winning song received praises from the judges. Gonzaga commented: "We were expecting that you were only going to serenade us..." while Misalucha added: "...you leveled up. You proved to us that you're more than just a heartthrob. You are a singing heartthrob." I Love OPM host Anne Curtis also remarked in a separate interview: "He did such an amazing job and I think he really proved himself. His purpose was to show everyone that he can really sing and that he is not just there to bring kilig to the audience. It radiated well in his heartfelt performance and I think that made him the Grand Touristar."

Filmography

Television

Discography

Awards and nominations

References

External links 

 

1995 births
Living people
People from Antipolo
People from Goyang
South Korean male singers
South Korean pop singers
English-language singers from South Korea
Singers from Seoul
Star Magic
Viva Artists Agency
South Korean expatriates in the Philippines
Reality show winners
Participants in Philippine reality television series
De La Salle University alumni
Tagalog-language singers of South Korea
Star Music artists